Bathyliotina nakayasui, is a species of sea snail, a marine gastropod mollusk in the family Liotiidae.

Description
The height of the shell attains 15 mm.

Distribution
This marine species occurs off the Philippines and in the South China Sea at a depth of about 150 m.

References

 McLean, J. H. 1988. Two New Species of Liotiinae (Gastropoda: Turbinidae) from the Philippine Islands. Veliger 30(4): 408–411

External links
 

nakayasui
Gastropods described in 1981